This is a complete list of original characters performed by Tracey Ullman in Tracey Ullman's State of the Union.

A

Linda Alvarez
Appearances: Season 1, 2, and 3
Location: Buffalo, New York
Local news reporter.
In series two, she becomes the site for attention when she gets stung by a bee and ends up on YouTube.

Arnelle
Appearances: Season 2
Location: Las Vegas, Nevada
Cirque du Soleil performer.

B

Doris Basham
Appearances: Season 1
Location: On the North Dakota/Canada Border
Elderly woman who gets busted for smuggling Canadian prescription drugs.

Muriel Bass
Appearances: Season 3
Location: Wichita, Kansas
Vocal coach.

Rosa Batista
Appearances: Season 1
Location: Stranded on the Katzman Memorial Bridge, Los Angeles, California
Housekeeper to Arianna Huffington.

Irma Billings
Appearances: Season 1
Location: Plainsville, Nebraska
Average citizen who converses with her neighbor, Betsy Jean.

C

Tori Campbell
Appearances: Season 2
Location: New York, New York
Dog walker.

Beverly Carlyle
Appearances: Season 2
Piano bar performer.

Caroline
Appearances: Season 3
Location(s): San Francisco, California, Rapid City, North Dakota
Antiques Roadshow appraiser.

Robin Cavanaugh
Appearances: Season 2
Location: Chicago's Gold Coast
Rich wife who is having to economize.

Marion Churchill
Appearances: Season 1
Location: New York, New York
Jamaican caregiver.

Leslie Katz-Coen
Appearances: Season 2
Location: Taos, New Mexico
Publicist to the Dalai Lama.

Simona Cowell
Appearances: Season 3
Location: Bel Air, California
Sister of Simon Cowel.

Grammy Cyrus
Appearances: Season 2
Location: Flatwoods, Kentucky
Grandmother to Miley Cyrus.

D

Karen DaFoe
Appearances: Season 2
Location: Woodsville, Vermont
Mother of teen mother.

Zoey Daniels
Appearances: Season 3
Location: Coral Gables, Florida
Woman who along with her husband refuses to leave a rundown mansion.

E

Vicky Emming
Appearances: Season 3
Location: Clovis, New Mexico
Woman addicted to the internet.

Esther
Appearances: Season 2
Location: Wild Spunk, Texas 
FLDS woman.

Polly Everson
Appearances: Season 3
Location: Washington, DC
Woman who sets up for investigative hearings.

F

Valerie Frumkiss
Appearances: Season 2
Location: Battlecreek, Michigan
Ex-performer. Senior citizen.

G

Lynne Garibaldi
Appearances: Season 2
Location: Albany, New York
Lynne is a working class mother of a handicapped child who is obsessed with Harry Potter, and she is a historical reenactment actress.

Glamorous Hostess
Appearances: Season 2
Location: The Mayo Clinic, Minnesota 
Host of So You Think You Can Die, a parody of So You Think You Can Dance.

Graceland Employee
Appearances: Season 3
Location: Memphis, Tennessee
Worker in souvenir shop.

H

Abby Melina Harris
Appearances: Season 1
Location: Undisclosed location in Arizona
Owner of "Dignity Village", a community for women 35 and over "never to be seen in public again."

Lacy Harris
Appearances: Season 1
Location: Greenville, North Carolina
A farmer.

Dr. Kara Hemdale
Appearances: Season 3
Location: Bangor, Maine
Scientist who successfully clones Rupert Murdoch.

Rosarita Hernandez 
Appearances: Season 2
Location: Texas/Mexico border 
Illegal immigrant who crosses the border.

I

Import/Export Pier worker
Appearances: Season 1
Location: Long Beach, California
Export worker who worries about how much America is exporting.

J

Juanita
Appearances: Season 2
Location: Los Angeles, California 
Dancing with the Stars dancer.

JetBlue airline steward
Appearances: Season 1
Location: Grounded in, Chicago, Illinois
A flight attendant on a JetBlue flight.

K

Sally Knox
Appearances: Season 1
Location: New York, New York
Investment banker, who has an ongoing affair with her boss, Chris Fullbright.

L

Penny Landers
Appearances: Season 2
Location: Cascade Mountains, Central Oregon
Euthanasia provider.

Mary Ann LeFrak
Appearances: Season 1
Location: Columbus, Mississippi
An expectant mother in her seventies.

Jacqueline Lord
Appearances: Season 2 and 3
Location: Honolulu, Hawaii
Daughter of Jack Lord.

Rachel Ludlow
Appearances: Season 2
Location: Connecticut
Lesbian who is getting married.

Tina Luffler
Appearances: Season 3
Location: Plainsville, Missouri
Woman who went missing as a young girl in 1972.  Was trapped in her parents' basement by her father.

M

Dr. Maguire
Appearances: Season 2
Overzealous doctor who over-prescribes medication.

Marta
Appearances: Season 2
Olympic trainer.

Sindra Mataal
Appearances: Season 1
Location: New York, New York
Undocumented Bangladeshi worker.

Brenda McKinney
Appearances: Season 3
Mother with an out of control pre-teen.

Dee McNally
Appearances: Season 2, and 3
Flight attendant.

Miriam Minger
Appearances: Season 2
Location: Casper, Wyoming
School teacher who seduces students.

Chanel Monticello
Appearances: Season 1, 2, and 3
Location: Chicago, Illinois, at O'Hare International
Airport security scanner.

Patty Sue Mulligan
Appearances: Season 3
Location: Waycross, Georgia
Teleservice center worker for India.

N

Nancy
Appearances: Season 3
Location: Hudson River
Whale rescuer.

O

Shrilynne O'Dale
Appearances: Season 1
Location: Colorado
Parishioner who is participating in her church's "Walk A Mile In Their Shoes" program.

P

Mother Superior Rose Pannatella
Appearances: Season 1
Location: St. Mary's, Pennsylvania
Always in deep meditation.

Sgt. Lisa Penning
Appearances: Season 1 and 2
Location: Macon, Georgia
On leave from Iraq.  She is part of a PBS special entitled, Moms At War.

Padma Perkesh
Appearances: Season 1, 2 and 3
Location: Oak Ridge, Tennessee
An Indian American pharmacist who puts a Bollywood-twist on medication side effects.

Chandra Perkett
Appearances: Season 1
Location: Coshocton, Ohio
Public access yoga instructor.

Ramona Petrie
Appearances: Season 2 and 3
Location: Summerston, West Virginia 
Woman stuck in a small car.

Gretchen Pinkus
Appearances: Season 1, 2 and 3
Location: Huntsville, Texas
Widow of "The Wetwipe Killer". She later marries "The Tastee-Freez Rapist". She releases a memoir entitled White Widow. She dies in a meth lab fire in Season 3.

Vanessa Pludd
Appearances: Season 2
Morbidly obese woman.

Carol Pholgren
Appearances: Season 3
Location: Akron, Ohio
Jeans entrepreneur.

Q

Asmaa Qasim
Appearances: Season 1 and 2
Location: The Ozarks
The most famous star in Malawi who comes to adopt an American child.

R

Emily Racine
Appearances: Season 3
Bookstore owner.

Marilyn Richter
Appearances: Season 3
Location: Guthrie, Oklahoma
CSI wannabe.

Ronnie Rooney
Appearances: Season 1
Location: Saint Paul, Minnesota
Older brother to Andy Rooney.

S

Sacha Baron Cohen victim
Appearances: Season 3
Location: Osborne, Kansas
Woman who received PTSD due to the antics of comedian Sacha Baron Cohen.

Sally
Appearances: Season 3
Location: Flushing, Michigan
Green collar worker.

Elena Sarkovsky
Appearances: Season 1
Location: New York, New York, at the United Nations
Russian UN interpreter.

September 11th Press Conference Organizer
Appearances: Season 3
Location: New York City
Presenter of proposed 9/11 monuments.

Shannon
Appearances: Season 2
Natural food store worker.

Janie Shaw
Appearances: Season 3
Location: Omaha
Woman who gets harassed for smoking.

Shana Shonsteen
Appearances: Season 3
Location: Milwaukee, Wisconsin
Jewish female suitor.

Jillian Smart
Appearances: Season 2
Location: Central Arizona
Soccer mom.

Sandra Stevens
Appearances: Season 1
Location: Mustang, Oklahoma
WNBA coach.

T

Tennis Instructor
Appearances: Season 3
Location: Jupiter, Florida
Female tennis instructor.

Anette Thomas
Appearances: Season 1
Location: Saint Paul, Minnesota
Regional theater actress who returns to the stage after having had a hip replacement.

Ingrid Thorvall
Appearances: Season 2, and 3
Location: Oakridge, Tennessee 
Woman with mitral valve prolapse who is forced to get surgery abroad.

Wendy Trenton
Appearances: Season 2
Location: Illinois 
Champion hog caller.

U

Upper East side rich woman
Appearances: Season 3
Location: New York City
Woman who hides her extravagant purchases due to the recession.

V

Carmen Valk
Appearances: Season 1
Location: East Coast
Homeless woman who is without health insurance.

W

Edith Wertzel
Appearances: Season 3
Location: Spartanburg County, South Carolina 
Obese woman who takes on laziness.

Emily Westin
Appearances: Season 3 
Location: Flat River, Missouri
Woman desperate for a job.

Vera Wilson
Appearances: Season 3
Location: Laredo, Texas
Vendor at gun show.

Tracey Ullman